Pyrausta laristanalis is a moth in the family Crambidae. It was described by Hans Georg Amsel in 1961. It is found in Iran and the United Arab Emirates.

References

Moths described in 1961
laristanalis
Moths of Asia